Kerion is a symphonic metal band from France.

Biography

French symphonic metal band Kerion features a lyrical choir, as well as metal choirs by Phil Gordana (Fairyland) and a lyrical singer as their guest vocalist. Their albums don cover art by artist JP Fournier (Avantasia, Edguy), and have been mixed in Harkam Studio by Wildric Lievin (Hamka, Fairyland) and Guillaume Serra. "Holy Creatures Quest" shows a powerful and symphonic metal sound.
 
Kerion began as an instrumental Prog Metal band in 1997 under the name of "Kirlian". However, a female singer named Flora then joined the lineup and the band's sound evolved into one which leaned more towards symphonic metal. They released two demos conceptually based on the heroic fantasy tale "Staraxis" written by Chris Barberi: the "Conspiracy of Darkness" and "The Last Sunset".

It was due time for a release, and 2008's "Holy Creatures Quest" was the third and final part of Barberi's novel.

As newer fans asked to hear old demos, the band decided to rewrite some of the songs and have a real studio recording, as they were not happy with the quality of the demos. Their second album "The Origins", as its name indicates, is the result of this musical revival.

Musical Style

Line-up
 Rémi - Guitars
 Sylvain - Guitars
 Flora - Vocals
 Antony - Bass
 JB - Drums

Past members
 Sam - Drums
 Bass - Stéphane

Discography

Studio albums 
 2008: Holy Creatures Quest
 2010: The Origins
 2012: CloudRiders Part I: Road to Skycity
 2015: CloudRiders Part 2: Technowars
 2022: Cloudriders: Age Of Cyborgs

Demos 
 2003: Conspiracy of Darkness
 2005: The Last Sunset

References

External links
 Official website

French symphonic metal musical groups
Musical groups established in 2003
Musical quintets